The 2022–23 Malaysia Quadrangular Series was a Twenty20 International (T20I) cricket tournament which took place in Malaysia in December 2022. The participating teams were the hosts Malaysia along with Bahrain, Qatar and Singapore.

The last game of the round-robin, between Bahrain and Qatar, was abandoned because of rain, which meant that Bahrain progressed to the final at the expense of their opponents. Bahrain beat Malaysia by 6 wickets in the final.

Squads

Round-robin

Points table

 Qualified for the final
 Advanced to the third place play-off

Fixtures

Third place play-off

Final

References

External links
 Series home at ESPNcricinfo

Associate international cricket competitions in 2022–23
Sports competitions in Malaysia